The Show County Quality is an Australian Turf Club Group 3 Thoroughbred horse race for three-year-olds and older, run as a quality handicap over a distance of 1200 metres at Randwick Racecourse, Sydney, Australia in August. Total prize money for the race is A$200,000.

History

The race is named in honour of the versatile sprinter Show County, who was predominant as a two-year-old and three year old winning in 1988 and 1989 the following races:
Breeders' Plate, Silver Slipper Stakes, Maribyrnong Plate, Skyline Stakes, Stan Fox Stakes, San Domenico Stakes, Roman Consul Stakes.

Grade
 1993–2012 - Listed race
 2013 onwards - Group 3

Venue
1993–1994 - Randwick Racecourse
1995–1999 - Warwick Farm Racecourse 
2000 - Canterbury Park Racecourse
2001–2004 - Warwick Farm Racecourse 
 2005–2006 - Randwick Racecourse
 2008 onwards - Warwick Farm Racecourse
 2009 - Randwick Racecourse
2010–2013 - Warwick Farm Racecourse
 2014 onwards - Randwick Racecourse

Winners

 2022 - Showmanship
 2021 - Private Eye
2020 - Roheryn
2019 - Deprive
2018 - Le Romain
2017 - Deploy
2016 - Tycoon Tara
2015 - Decision Time
2014 - Terravista
2013 - Rebel Dane
2012 - Moment of Change
2011 - Skytrain
2010 - Kenny's World
2009 - Swift Alliance
2008 - Bank Robber
2007 - †race not held
2006 - Primus
2005 - Lotteria 
2004 - Athelnoth 
2003 - Sportsman 
2002 - Presently 
2001 - Kingsgate 
2000 - Stanzaic 
1999 - Upright 
1998 - Siddinghausen 
1997 - Might And Power 
1996 - Winning Hand  
1995 - Identikit  
1994 - Remouche  
1993 - Big Dreams  

† Not held because of outbreak of equine influenza

See also
 List of Australian Group races
 Group races

External links 
 Show County Quality (ATC)

References

Horse races in Australia